Chinnari Puttanna is a 1968 Indian Kannada-language film, directed and produced by B. R. Panthulu. The film stars B. R. Panthulu, Ramesh, Narasimharaju and Ranga. The film has musical score by T. G. Lingappa.

Cast

B. R. Panthulu
Ramesh
Narasimharaju
Ranga
Dinesh
Chi Vishwanath
B. Vijayalakshmi
Udaya Chandrika
Jr. Revathi
Lalitha
Ramachandra Shastry
Nagappa
Hanumantha Rao
Guggu
Maccheri
Narayan
M. P. Shankar
Shyam
Mallesh
Rama Rao
Ranganath
Master Ravi
Master Basavaraj
Papamma
Shanthamma
Suguna
Jayanthi
Baby Sunanda
Baby Prema

Soundtrack
The music was composed by T. G. Lingappa.

References

External links
 
 

1968 films
1960s Kannada-language films
Films scored by T. G. Lingappa
Films directed by B. R. Panthulu